The Greenville Bluesmen were a minor league baseball team that played in Greenville, Mississippi.  The team was a member of the independent Big South League from 1996–1997 and the independent Texas–Louisiana League from 1998–2001.  The team played at Legion Field in Greenville.

Seasons
The following is a list of all-time Bluesmen regular season results in both the Big South League (1996–1997) and Texas–Louisiana League (1998–2001).  Greenville had a cumulative record of 202-303 (.400) over six seasons.

Postseason results
The Bluesmen qualified for the postseason twice, in both of their season in the Big South League.  The team won the league championship in each year.

Attendance
The following is a list of Bluesmen attendance figures in both the Big South League (1996–1997) and Texas–Louisiana League (1998–2001). In six season, the Bluesmen had a total attendance of 156,789 spectators, for an average of 26,132 per season.

References

Defunct baseball teams in Mississippi
Defunct minor league baseball teams
Baseball teams disestablished in 2001
Defunct independent baseball league teams
Baseball teams established in 1996
1996 establishments in Mississippi
2001 disestablishments in Mississippi
Greenville, Mississippi